Warmian subdialect (Warmian: warnijsko godka) is a subdialect of Polish language, present in the historical region of Warmia, in Warmian-Masurian Voivodeship, Poland. It is spoken by Warmians. It is commonly regarded as a part of Masovian dialect, and sometimes alternatively as a part of Chełmno Kociewie Warmian dialect.

It developed in the 14th century, after Polish speakers who settled in the area. It formed from various dialects of the settlers and was shaped by the literary version of Polish language used in religious literature. Since the 19th century, the subdialect began adopting loanwords from German, due to the Germanisation of the area.

Citations

References 

Polish dialects
Prussia